Air Vice Marshal Deryck Cameron Stapleton,  (15 January 1918 – 16 February 2018) was a Royal Air Force officer who served as Commandant of the RAF Staff College, Bracknell from 1966 to 1968.

RAF career
Educated at King Edward VI School in Totnes, Stapleton joined the Royal Air Force in 1936. He received a short-service commission as an acting pilot officer on 13 July 1936, was regraded to pilot officer on 18 May 1937 and was promoted to flying officer on 18 November 1938. He was promoted to the acting rank of flight lieutenant on 2 March 1939, and was decorated with the Air Force Cross (AFC) in the 1939 Birthday Honours list.

Stapleton served in the Second World War in East Africa, the Middle East, North Africa and Italy. He was promoted to the substantive rank of flight lieutenant on 3 September 1940, by which time he was an acting squadron leader. As an acting squadron leader with No. 14 Squadron RAF, then stationed in Eritrea, he was awarded the Distinguished Flying Cross (DFC):

 

Stapleton was mentioned in despatches in 1943, and promoted to temporary wing commander on 1 January 1944. He was promoted to wing commander (war substantive) on 26 March 1945. On 1 September 1945, he was granted a permanent commission in the RAF, with the substantive rank of squadron leader (seniority from 1 June 1944).

After the war Stapleton became Assistant Secretary (Air) in 1945 and Secretary of the Chiefs of Staff Committee in 1947. With the post-war contraction of the armed forces, he relinquished his temporary rank of wing commander on 1 November 1947. As an acting group captain, Stapleton was appointed a Commander of the Order of the British Empire, Military Division (CBE) in the 1948 New Year Honours list. He was appointed as the Station Commander at RAF Odiham in 1949. 

Stapleton was promoted to the substantive rank of wing commander on 1 July 1950 and to the substantive rank of group captain on 1 January 1957. He spent much of the 1950s in various military headquarters. He was appointed a Companion of the Order of the Bath, Military Division (CB) in the 1960 Birthday Honours. He was promoted to air commodore on 1 January 1961, and became Director of Plans at the Air Ministry in March 1961. He was promoted to air vice-marshal on 1 July 1963, and was appointed Director of Defence Plans at the Ministry of Defence; in May 1964 he became Air Officer Commanding No. 1 Group. After that he became Commandant of the RAF Staff College, Bracknell in June 1966 before retiring in April 1968.

Later life
Stapleton died on 16 February 2018 at the age of 100.

References

|-

1918 births
2018 deaths
Commanders of the Order of the British Empire
Companions of the Order of the Bath
English centenarians
Men centenarians
Recipients of the Air Force Cross (United Kingdom)
Recipients of the Distinguished Flying Cross (United Kingdom) 
Royal Air Force air marshals
Royal Air Force personnel of World War II